The first Chola invasion of Kalinga by Kulothunga Chola I in 1097 was intended to avenge the invasion of Vengi by the forces of Kalinga. The war resulted in the subjugation of Kalinga and its reduction to the position of a tributary state of the Chola Empire.

Causes 

In 1097, the army of Kalinga invaded the Eastern Chalukya kingdom which was then a vassal of the Chola Empire. The troops of Kalinga were supported by the chief of Kolanu near Ellore. A huge army under Vikrama Chola was sent to repulse the invaders. The army was supported by troops under the Pandya viceroy, Parantaka Pandya. The invasion was beaten back and the retreating army was pursued back into Kalinga. Kalinga was subdued after a drawn-out war.

See also 
 Chola invasion of Kalinga (1110)

Notes

References 
 

Conflicts in 1097
Military campaigns involving the Chola Empire
Kalinga (India)
1097 in Asia
11th century in India